= Ko Min-sung =

South Korean footballer (born 1995)

Personal information
- Full name: Ko Min-sung
- Date of birth: 20 November 1995 (age 30)
- Place of birth: South Korea
- Height: 1.75 m (5 ft 9 in)
- Position: Midfielder

Senior career*
Years	Team	Apps	(Gls)
2015–2018	Suwon Samsung Bluewings	1	(0)
2016	→ Gangwon FC (loan)	11	(0)
2018	→ Daejeon Citizen (loan)	7	(0)
- * Club domestic league appearances and goals as of 1 February 2019

Ko Min-sung (Korean: 고민성; born 20 November 1995) is a South Korean footballer.
